The Billboard Hot R&B/Hip-Hop Songs chart ranks the best-performing singles in that category in the United States. The first number one song of the year was claimed by Trey Songz with his song "Can't Be Friends"; it spent the first six weeks of 2011 at number one, and also topped the chart the last seven weeks of 2010, therefore spending 13 weeks atop the chart in total. Drake topped the chart for seven consecutive weeks as a featured artist on two different songs; his collaboration with Jamie Foxx, "Fall for Your Type", spent two consecutive weeks at number one, and was followed by his collaboration with Nicki Minaj, "Moment 4 Life", which topped the chart for five consecutive weeks. Chris Brown's collaboration with Lil Wayne & Busta Rhymes, "Look at Me Now", topped the chart for eight consecutive weeks.

Although Miguel's "Sure Thing" only topped the chart for one week, it ranked as the number one song on Billboards Hot R&B/Hip-Hop Songs year end list. Kelly Rowland's collaboration with Lil Wayne, "Motivation", topped the chart for seven non-consecutive weeks. "Motivation" ranked at number two on the year end list. DJ Khaled's song "I'm On One", featuring Drake, Rick Ross & Lil Wayne, spent 11 non-consecutive weeks at number one, and was the longest running number one single on the chart in 2011. Big Sean's collaboration with Kanye West & Roscoe Dash, "Marvin & Chardonnay", topped the chart for one week. Lil Wayne's collaboration with Drake, "She Will", peaked at number one for four consecutive weeks. Jay-Z and Kanye West's "Niggas in Paris" topped the chart for seven consecutive weeks. The last number one of 2011 was Wale's collaboration featuring with Miguel, "Lotus Flower Bomb".

List

See also
2011 in music
 List of number-one rhythm and blues hits (United States)

References

2011
United States RandB Singles
2011 in American music